Miatsum was a concept and a slogan used during the Karabakh movement in the late 1980s and early 1990s, which led to the First Nagorno-Karabakh War in 1992–1994.

The idea originated in an era of realignment among the Armenians who were unhappy that the area inhabited predominantly by an Armenian population has remained under the jurisdiction of Azerbaijan. From the 1970s, with the support of the first secretary of the Central Committee of Communist Party of Azerbaijan SSR, Heydar Aliyev, a policy of settling NKAO by Azerbaijanis was being implemented. The Armenian pogroms in Sumgait and Baku only exacerbated these trends, which led to military clashes between troops of the Republic of Azerbaijan and the forces of the Nagorno-Karabakh Defense Army (Artsakh).

See also
 Enosis
 United Armenia
 Republic of Artsakh
 First Nagorno-Karabakh War
 Lachin corridor
 History of Nagorno-Karabakh

References

Nagorno-Karabakh
Republic of Artsakh
First Nagorno-Karabakh War
National unifications
Armenian nationalism
Armenian irredentism
Pan-nationalism